Maureen Peters may refer to:

Maureen Peters (novelist) (1935–2008), historical novelist
Maureen Peters (cricketer) (born 1943), New Zealand cricketer